The Crucible is a 1996 American historical drama film directed by Nicholas Hytner and written by Arthur Miller, based on his 1953 play of the same title. It stars Daniel Day-Lewis as John Proctor, Winona Ryder as Abigail Williams, Paul Scofield as Judge Thomas Danforth, Joan Allen as Elizabeth Proctor and Bruce Davison as Reverend Samuel Parris. Set during the Salem witch trials, the film chronicles a group of teenage girls who, after getting caught conjuring love spells in the woods, are forced to lie that Satan had "invaded" them, and subsequently accuse several innocent people of witchcraft.

Despite underperforming commercially, grossing only $7 million on a $25 million budget, the film received positive reviews, with Day-Lewis, Ryder, Scofield, and Allen earning widespread acclaim for their performances.

The film was screened at the 47th Berlin International Film Festival, where it competed for the Golden Bear. At the 54th Golden Globe Awards, Scofield and Allen were nominated for Best Supporting Actor and Best Supporting Actress respectively, while Allen received a Best Supporting Actress nomination at the 69th Academy Awards, and Scofield won Best Actor in a Supporting Role at the 50th British Academy Film Awards. Arthur Miller received nominations for the Academy Award for Best Adapted Screenplay and the BAFTA Award for Best Adapted Screenplay.

Plot
In Salem, Massachusetts, in 1692, a group of village girls meet in the woods with slave Tituba, attempting to conjure love spells. Abigail Williams kills a chicken and drinks its blood, wishing for John Proctor's wife Elizabeth to die. When Abigail's uncle, Reverend Samuel Parris, discovers them, the girls run away, but his daughter Betty collapses unconscious.

Betty will not awaken, nor will Thomas and Ann Putnam's daughter Ruth, who was also conjuring. Giles Corey, who suspects that the children are just acting out, and John Proctor, with whom Abigail had an affair, visit the Parris household. Believing Betty and Ruth to be demonically possessed, Parris and the Putnams call Reverend John Hale from nearby Beverly to examine Betty. To save herself and the other girls from punishment, Abigail accuses Tituba of witchcraft. After being whipped, Tituba confesses to seeing the devil and is saved from being hanged. Struck by their new power, the girls begin naming numerous other women, including Elizabeth, whom they "saw" with the devil.

John wants to forget about his affair with Abigail and get back with Elizabeth. He decides to stop Abigail's accusations, telling his servant, Mary Warren, who is one of the "afflicted" girls, to testify at the trial that the witchcraft was faked. In court, Francis Nurse gives a list of people vouching for the accused; the judges order that all on the list be arrested and brought in for questioning. Giles insists that when Ruth accused Rebecca Nurse, Mr. Putnam was heard to tell Ruth that she had won him a "fine gift of land". Giles refuses to identify who heard this remark, and the judges order his arrest. Mary Warren insists she only thought she saw spirits but the other girls later cow her into recanting. Elizabeth says she is pregnant and will be spared from death until the baby is born, but John insists that the girls be charged with false witness.

The girls are called in and asked if they were lying about the witchcraft, but they start screaming that Mary Warren is bewitching them. To demonstrate Abigail's complicity, John confesses to having sex with her, claiming that she accused Elizabeth in order to get rid of her so that she could marry him. Abigail denies the affair, so Elizabeth is called in to verify it. Unaware that John confessed and wanting to save his reputation, she lies. As Reverend Hale tries to persuade the court of John's honesty, the girls turn the court further against the Proctors by screaming that Mary Warren is attacking them as a "yellow bird". John repeats his accusation that the girls are merely pretending, but they run outside from the "bird" into a nearby lake. To save herself from being hanged, Mary Warren accuses John of witchcraft. When asked if he will return to God, John despairingly yells "I say God is dead!" and is arrested as a witch.

On the day before John is to be hanged, Reverend Hale confronts Abigail at the now-abandoned homes of the victims whom she testified against. Because Hale was the lone official in the court to doubt her claims, Abigail attempts to convince the court that Hale's wife is also a witch; however, this backfires as the judges doubt her, as they consider a minister's wife to be pure. Eventually, the girls become outcasts and Abigail steals Parris' money to flee to Barbados, but not before asking John to go with her, telling him she never wished any of this on him. He refuses, stating "It's not on a ship we'll meet again, but in Hell".

Parris fears that John's hanging will cause riots directed at him, so he allows Elizabeth to meet with John to convince him to "confess" and save his life. John agrees and writes the confession. The judges insist that he sign the confession and publicly display it to prove his guilt and to convince others to confess, but John, determined to keep his name pure for his sons, angrily shouts "Leave me my name!", and tears it up.

On the gallows, John, Rebecca Nurse and Martha Corey's recitation of the Lord's Prayer is cut short when they are hanged.

Cast

Background

In 1952, Miller's friend Elia Kazan appeared before the House Un-American Activities Committee (HUAC); fearful of being blacklisted from Hollywood, Kazan named eight members of the Group Theatre, including Clifford Odets, Paula Strasberg, Lillian Hellman, and John Garfield, who in recent years had been fellow members of the Communist Party. After speaking with Kazan about his testimony, Miller traveled to Salem, Massachusetts to research the witch trials of 1692. The Crucible, in which Miller likened the situation with the House Un-American Activities Committee to the witch hunt in Salem in 1692, opened at the Beck Theatre on Broadway on January 22, 1953.

Miller and Kazan were close friends throughout the late 1940s and early 1950s (the latter had directed the original production of Miller's Death of a Salesman), but after Kazan's testimony to the HUAC, the pair's friendship ended, and they did not speak to each other for the next ten years. The HUAC took an interest in Miller himself not long after The Crucible opened, denying him a passport to attend the play's London opening in 1954. Later Miller was further checked out: when testimony came out that he misled the HUAC, he was sentenced to a $500 fine and a 30-day stay in jail. It was overturned on appeal. Kazan defended his own actions through his film On the Waterfront, in which a dockworker heroically testifies against a corrupt union boss.

Though the play was widely considered only somewhat successful at the time of its first production, today The Crucible is Miller's most frequently produced work throughout the world. It was adapted as an opera by Robert Ward, which won the Pulitzer Prize for Music in 1962.

Historical accuracy
The movie kept many of the play's documented inaccuracies. Various characters' ages were changed including making Abigail Williams older and John Proctor younger when in reality they were approximately 12 and 60 respectively. Like the play, the movie fabricates a relationship between the two. Characters and events were also conflated, such as featuring Thomas Danforth presiding over the trials when he was not documented to do so in reality, or combining the trials and sentences of John Proctor, Martha Corey, and Rebecca Nurse.

Reception
The movie was not a box office success, making only $7,343,114 in the United States.

Critical reception
The film has an overall score of 70% on the review aggregation website Rotten Tomatoes, based on 63 critic reviews, with an average rating of 7.3/10. The critics consensus states, "This staid adaptation of The Crucible dutifully renders Arthur Miller's landmark play on the screen with handsome production design and sturdy performances, if not with the political anger and thematic depth that earned the drama its reputation." Victor Navasky of The New York Times wrote that the film was "thought impossible to make during the McCarthy years" due to its allegorical connections to McCarthyism, yet was "probably destined for Hollywood all along".

Owen Gleiberman of Entertainment Weekly gave the film a grade of "A", calling the adaptation "joltingly powerful" and noting the "spectacularly" acted performances of Day-Lewis, Scofield, and Allen. Roger Ebert gave the film 2 out of 4 stars, writing that the "story has all the right moves and all the correct attitudes, but there is something lacking at its core; I think it needs less frenzy and more human nature". Philip Thomas of Empire gave the film 5 out of 5 stars, calling it an "almost perfect screen adaptation".

Awards and honors

The film is recognized by American Film Institute in these lists:
 2008: AFI's 10 Top 10:
 Nominated Courtroom Drama Film

References

External links
 
 
 
 

1996 films
1996 drama films
20th Century Fox films
American drama films
BAFTA winners (films)
Drama films based on actual events
Essex, Massachusetts
Films scored by George Fenton
Films about capital punishment
Films about lawyers
Films about McCarthyism
Films about miscarriage of justice
American films based on plays
Films directed by Nicholas Hytner
Films set in the 1690s
Films shot in Massachusetts
Films set in Massachusetts
Films set in the Thirteen Colonies
Films about narcissism
Salem witch trials in fiction
Films about witchcraft
Films with screenplays by Arthur Miller
1990s English-language films
1990s American films